Washington County Memorial Airport  is a county-owned, public-use airport in Washington County, Kansas, United States. It is located five nautical miles (6 mi, 9 km) south of the central business district of Washington, Kansas.

Facilities and aircraft 
Washington County Memorial Airport covers an area of 23 acres (9 ha) at an elevation of 1,436 feet (438 m) above mean sea level. It has one runway designated 17/35 with a concrete surface measuring 3,406 by 60 feet (1,038 x 18 m).

For the 12-month period ending November 16, 2010, the airport had 1,700 general aviation aircraft operations, an average of 141 per month. At that time there were 3 aircraft based at this airport, all single-engine.

References

External links 
 Airport page at Washington County website
 Washington County Memorial Airport (K38) at Kansas DOT Airport Directory
 Aerial image as of October 1991 from USGS The National Map
 
 

Airports in Kansas
Buildings and structures in Washington County, Kansas